Metres above the Adriatic (Serbo-Croatian: Metara iznad Jadrana) is the vertical datum used in Austria, in the former Yugoslavian states of Slovenia, Croatia, Bosnia-Hercegovina, Serbia, Montenegro, North Macedonia, as well as in Albania to measure elevation, referring to the average water level of the Adriatic Sea at the Sartorio mole in the Port of Trieste.

Gauge 

The gauging station in the Port of Trieste was established in the 1875 by the local observatory run by the military geographical institute of the Austro-Hungarian Army. The average water surface elevation at Molo Sartorio became the datum valid for the whole Austro-Hungarian monarchy. Whilst the former Yugoslavian states still use it, the Eastern Bloc successor states of Austria-Hungary like Hungary and Czechoslovakia after World War II switched to the Kronstadt Gauge of the Baltic Sea, which is  higher.

Whilst for Austria the 1875 gauge is used as the datum, the states of former Yugoslavia use the 1900 gauge (Nadmorska visina, m/nv). In Albania (normal-orthometric height) they also refer to heights as 'metres above the Adriatic', but use a specific tide gauge in the port of Durrës.

Abbreviation 
The individual countries using this datum abbreviate it in different ways depending on their local language, as follows:
 Austria: m ü. Adria, m.ü.A. or müA, colloquially known as Seehöhe or Adriahöhe
 Hungary: mAf from méter Adria felett
 Former Yugoslavian states: m. i. J. from Metara iznad Jadrana
'Metres above the Adriatic' may be abbreviated in English to m AA

Height differences between Austria and neighbouring countries 
In Austria orthometric height is used, while its neighbours use other height systems, which leads to differences. On the state borders these differences are:
 Germany: +25 to +34 cm, normal height according to the Normalhöhennull levelling system based on the Amsterdam Ordnance Datum
 Italy: −0.5 to −3.2 cm, orthometric height referring to Genoa Tide Gauge
 Slovakia: +57 cm, normal height based on Kronstadt Tide Gauge
 Slovenia: −8 to −12 cm, orthometric height – metres above the sea referring to Koper Tide Gauge
 Czech Republic: +46 to +56.3 cm, normal height based on Kronstadt Tide Gauge, and
(Differences: HAustria − Hneighbouring states)

See also 

 Metre
 Normalhöhennull (NHN) (equivalent in Germany)
 Metres above the Sea (Switzerland)

References

External links 
  Trieste Institute of Marine Sciences 
  Austrian Federal Office of Metrology and Surveying

Vertical datums
Geography of Austria
Adriatic Sea
Zero-level elevation points